Pokrov, formerly Ordzhonikidze is a small city and mining town in Nikopol Raion, Dnipropetrovsk Oblast of central Ukraine. It hosts the administration of Pokrov urban hromada, one of the hromadas of Ukraine. Its population is approximately

History

In 1971, a large Golden Pectoral was discovered on the site of Tovsta Mohyla near Pokrov by the Ukrainian archaeologist Borys Mozolevskyi. It probably belonged to a Scythian chieftain of the 3rd century BC, but was likely made by Greek artisans of the Crimean peninsula.

The city was established in 1956 when several miner settlements of the Ordzhonikidze Mine were merged into a city. Since that time, mining towns such as Prychepylivka (today – Hirnytske) started to appear in the area. In 1886, in place of the modern city were created Pokrovski quarries. Pokrov is located on the site of the 17th century Chortomlyk Sich.

On 15 May 2015, President of Ukraine Petro Poroshenko signed a bill into law that started a six months period for the removal of communist monuments and the mandatory renaming of settlements with a name related to Communism. Since 2 April 2016, after it was officially renamed by the Ukrainian parliament, the city is officially named Pokrov.

Until 18 July 2020, Pokrov was incorporated as a city of oblast significance and the center of Pokrov Municipality. The municipality was abolished in July 2020 as part of the administrative reform of Ukraine, which reduced the number of raions of Dnipropetrovsk Oblast to seven. The area of Pokrov Municipality was merged into Nikopol Raion.

Notable residents
 Dasha Astafieva, January 2009 Playboy Playmate

Gallery

See also
Privat Group (corporation in control of the city's industry)

References

Cities in Dnipropetrovsk Oblast
Mining cities and regions in Ukraine
Populated places established in the Ukrainian Soviet Socialist Republic
Nikopol Raion
City name changes in Ukraine